The Broken Hills, or Broken Hills Range, is a mountain range bordering Churchill County, Nevada and Mineral County, Nevada.

History 
Joseph Arthur and James Stratford discovered the Broken Hills district in 1913, and were the first prospectors to find ore worth mining.

References 

Mountain ranges of Nevada
Mountain ranges of the Great Basin
Mountain ranges of Churchill County, Nevada